Sneaky Dee's is a concert venue and Tex-Mex restaurant in Toronto, Ontario, Canada. Originally opened in 1987 on the north west corner of Bloor Street and Bathurst, it moved to its present location at College and Bathurst in 1990.

History

562 Bloor West
Sneaky Dee's opened as a 24-hour restaurant at 562 Bloor Street in 1987. The basement contained a performance venue, which hosted the first Toronto Fringe Festival in 1989.

431 College
It moved to its current location at 431 College Street in 1990 and became a major venue for Canadian punk rock, hosting Armed and Hammered and other bands. In the early 1990s, Sneaky Dee's was a popular destination for anti-fascist and Anti-Racist Action (ARA) activists, and was the scene of a 1993 brawl between activists and the neo-Nazi Heritage Front after the vandalizing of a white supremacist's house in the east end. After briefly hosting DJs exclusively in the late 1990s, Sneaky Dee's returned to hosting live music in 2002.

Since 2011, local bands and artists have been invited to create signature dishes, including City and Colour's "Northern Blues Nachos", Cancer Bats' "The Destroyer", Sparrows' "Fifth Helena Homefries", Lights' "Cactus in The Valley Nachos", Death From Above 1979's "DFA Nachos", and  Fucked Up's two breakfast dishes "The Queen of Heart Attacks" and "Fucked Up Breakfast".

In September 2020, a proposal was submitted to the city of Toronto to demolish Sneaky Dee's and its surrounding buildings to construct a 13-story mixed-use condominium. Toronto city councilor Mike Layton voiced his opposition to the proposal, noting that Sneaky Dee's is "an iconic site and it would really be sad to see them go."

Impact
Sneaky Dee's is noted as a major venue for alternative culture and indie rock in Toronto. The venue hosted the long-running Wavelength Music Arts Projects and the Trampoline Hall Lecture Series, until both series moved to The Garrison in October 2009.

Notable artists who have performed at Sneaky Dee's include Kids on TV, Dirty Projectors, Feist, Barcelona Pavilion, Owen Pallett, Pup, Comeback Kid, Cancer Bats, The Flatliners, Gob, Nails, Living With Lions, Broken Social Scene, Real Zombies Never Die, and Republic of Safety. Sneaky Dee's was also featured in the Scott Pilgrim series of graphic novels written by Bryan Lee O'Malley.

References

External links
Official website

Music venues in Toronto
Restaurants in Toronto
Nightclubs in Toronto